Tom Csipkay is an American former professional tennis player.

Biography
Csipkay, one of six siblings, grew up in Wyckoff, New Jersey. His elder brother Bill played professionally and one of his sisters Mary Ann was the women's head coach at Indiana State for 11 years. 

A New Jersey state champion, Csipkay played collegiate tennis for Indiana State, graduating in 1982.

On the professional tour he had a doubles semi-final appearance at the 1983 Head Classic in Stowe with brother Bill, beating fourth seeds Vijay Amritraj and John Fitzgerald en route. He and Bill featured in the men's doubles main draw of the 1983 US Open, where they lost in the first round to another sibling pairing of Vijay and Anand Amritraj.

References

External links
 
 

Year of birth missing (living people)
Living people
American male tennis players
Indiana State Sycamores athletes
College men's tennis players in the United States
Tennis people from New Jersey
Sportspeople from Bergen County, New Jersey
People from Wyckoff, New Jersey